Amarjot Kaur is an Indian statistician who in 2016 became the president of the International Indian Statistical Association. She works for Merck Research Laboratories,
as Executive Director of Clinical Biostatistics and Research Decision Sciences. She is also the 2017 treasurer of the American Statistical Association, and in 2013 she chaired the American Statistical Association Community of Applied Statisticians.

Before joining Merck, Kaur earned her Ph.D.  at Panjab University in Chandigarh, India, where she also worked as a lecturer. At Panjab, in the 1990s, Kaur published research in mathematical statistics on tests for stochastic dominance.
She joined Merck after postdoctoral research at Pennsylvania State University. At Merck, she became the chief statistician on the Multinational Etoricoxib and Diclofenac Arthritis Long-term (MEDAL) programme, a large international study of treatments for arthritis.

In 2014, she was elected to be a Fellow of the American Statistical Association.

Selected publications

References

Year of birth missing (living people)
Living people
Indian statisticians
Women statisticians
Fellows of the American Statistical Association